Phulchhab is the Gujarati daily published from Rajkot, Gujarat, India. It was founded in 1921 as a Saurashtra weekly. Saurashtra newspaper shifted to Rajkot in 1950 and its name changed to Phulchhab. Zaverchand Meghani, Amritlal Sheth, Kakkalbhai Kothari and many more dignities established truthful daily in Saurashtra region.

Mr. Zaverchand Meghani, Himmat bhai Parekh, Mr. Harsukhbhai Sanghani were the powerful editors of Phulchhab. The role of Phulchhab at the time before independence was very important. Phulchhab is a daily of Janmabhoomi Group of Newspapers. Its slogan is "Saurashtra ni Vichardhara". , the Managing Editor is Mr. Kundanbhai Vyas, Editor is Kaushik Mehta and Manager is Narendra Ziba.

Columnists 
 Nagindas Sanghvi
 Kajal Oza Vaidhya
 Sanjay Chhel
 Kundan Vyas
 Kaushik Mehta
 Bhadrayu Vachhrajani
 Kashyap Dholakia 
 Vipul Rathod
 Yashpal Baxi
 Soli Kapadiya

References

External links
 Phulchhab

Gujarati-language newspapers published in India
Rajkot
Newspapers published in Gujarat
1921 establishments in India
Newspapers established in 1921